Mujauna is a village in West Champaran district in the Indian state of Bihar. It comes under the Sugauli panchayat of Narkatiaganj block.

Demographics
As of 2011 India census, Mujauna had a population of 1993 in 358 households. Males constitute 48.8% of the population and females 51.1%. Mujauna has an average literacy rate of 48.46%, lower than the national average of 74%: male literacy is 58.28%, and female literacy is 41.71%. In Mujauna, 20.9% of the population is under 6 years of age.

References

Villages in West Champaran district